Wild Justice is a 1925 American silent adventure film directed by Chester Franklin and written by C. Gardner Sullivan. The film stars Peter the Great, George Sherwood, Frank Hagney, and Frances Teague. The film was released on July 6, 1925, by United Artists.

Plot
As described in a film magazine reviews, Bob Blake kills the prospector, Hadley, and seizes his cabin. The dog Arno, Hadley’s pal, hates Blake and Blake sells him to Dr. Dave Wright. Hadley’s daughter Polly Ann arrives and Blake attacks her. Dr. Wright rescues the young woman, and in revenge Blake stirs the settlers against the doctor as the killer of Hadley. Dr. Wright proves his innocence and forces a confession from Blake.

Cast
Peter the Great as Arno, a Dog
George Sherwood as Dr. Dave Wright
Frank Hagney as Bob Blake
Frances Teague as Polly Ann Hadley

Preservation
With no prints of Wild Justice located in any film archives, it is a lost film.

References

External links

1925 films
American silent feature films
American black-and-white films
United Artists films
1925 adventure films
American adventure films
Lost American films
1925 lost films
Lost adventure films
1920s English-language films
1920s American films
Silent adventure films